Kalam-kalam Langit is a 2016 Indonesian drama film directed by Tarmizi Abka.

References

External links 
 Trailer

2010s Indonesian-language films
2016 films
Indonesian drama films